The Bushnell Rock Member is a geologic rock formation, named after an outcropping of an exposed portion of the member itself known as Bushnell Rock by University of Oregon Geologist Ewart M. Baldwin in 1974.  This combined with Tenmile Member and Olalla Creek Member makeup the larger Lookingglass Formation lying beneath the Lookingglass Valley in Douglas County, Oregon.

Lithology 
The Bushnell Rock Member is a basal conglomerate with sandstone beds occurring on a rarity.  It was deposited by an onlapping sea that started during the Paleocene but the bulk of the formation was deposited during the early Eocene. The conglomerate is composed of 70% rock fragments (60% sedimentary, 30% metamorphic, 10% volcanic) 1 to 2 inches in diameter and a 30% percent matrix of medium to coarsegrained sands(66% quartz, 33% feldspar).   Because the member is not well exposed other than a few limited areas, measurement for the overall stratigraphic thickness has not been achieved.  It was determined in one measured section to be at least 5 meters thick but there is indication where it contacts the Olalla Creek Member of up to 100 meters.

Fossils 
Conglomerate rocks can produce fossils, but they are usually contained in a portion of a rock type within the fragment mix.  The Bushnell Rock Member is not known for producing fossils.

See also 
 List of fossiliferous stratigraphic units in Oregon
 Paleontology in Oregon

References

Bibliography 

Formations
Paleogene geology of Oregon